Rudresh Gowda (16 October 1955 – 24 March 2018) was an Indian politician.

Gowda trained to be a lawyer. He joined the Janata Party in 1985 and was elected to the Hassan District Council until 1996. Gowda sat in the 11th Lok Sabha, representing Janata Dal and the Janata Party in between 1996 and 1997. He left Janata Dal (Secular) in 2004 for the Indian National Congress. Gowda won election to the Karnataka Legislative Assembly as a representative of Belur in 2008 and 2013. He suffered a heart attack on 23 March 2018 and died of multiple organ failure the next day at a hospital in Bangalore, aged 62.

References

1955 births
2018 deaths
Deaths from multiple organ failure
Karnataka MLAs 2008–2013
Karnataka MLAs 2013–2018
Indian National Congress politicians from Karnataka
India MPs 1996–1997
Lok Sabha members from Karnataka
Janata Dal (Secular) politicians
Janata Party politicians